World Without Rules is the second studio album by Paul Haslinger, released on August 20, 1996 by RGB Records.

Track listing

Personnel 
Musicians
Charlie Campagna – guitar on "World Without Rules"
Paul Haslinger – instruments, engineering
Nona Hendryx – vocals on "World Without Rules", "Be-Bop in Baghdad" and "Global Ghetto"
Anna Homler – vocals on "Monkey Brain Sushi" and "Rainmaker's Dream"
Mark Isham – trumpet and flugelhorn on "Urban Source Code", "Be-Bop in Baghdad" and "Asian Blue"
Loren Nerell – gamelan on "Dismissal of the Hemisphere"
S'Ange – vocals on "Desert Diva"
Steve Whalen – bass guitar on "Urban Source Code", "Be-Bop in Baghdad", "Desert Diva" and "Global Ghetto"
Production and additional personnel
Stephen Hill – mastering, art direction
Bob Olhsson – mastering
Rex Ray – photography, design
Mitch Zelezny – production, mixing

References 

1996 albums
Paul Haslinger albums